Liatris novae-angliae, commonly known as the New England blazing-star, is a species of flowering plant in the family Asteraceae.

Conservation status in the United States
It is endangered in New Hampshire, New Jersey, and Rhode Island. It is threatened in Maine and New York. It is listed as a species of special concern in Connecticut, and in Massachusetts.

References

novae-angliae
Flora of North America